The Roman Catholic Diocese of Chilpancingo–Chilapa is a suffragan diocese of the Archdiocese of Acapulco.

History
The former Diocese of Chilapa in southern Mexico comprised the State of Guerrero. It was a suffragan of the Archdiocese of Mexico, and existed under that name from 1863 to 1989.

The early bishops were Ambrosia Serrano, Ramon Ibarra, and Homobono Anaya.

Father John Ssenyondo, a priest in Chilapa, also served under the dictatorship of Idi Amin in his native Uganda. He has been called "The Indiana Jones of the Faith." He was kidnapped and found dead near the town of Ocotlán in 2014.

Bishops

Ordinaries
Ambrosia María Serrano y Rodriguez (1863-1875)
Tomás Barón y Morales (1876-1882), appointed Bishop of León, Guanajuato
Buenaventura del Purísimo Corazón de María Portillo y Tejeda, O.F.M. Obs. (1882-1889), appointed  Bishop of Zacatecas
José Ramón Ibarra y González (1889-1902), appointed Bishop of Tlaxcala (Puebla de los Angeles)
José Homobono Anaya y Gutiérrez (1902-1906)
Francisco Maria Campos y Angeles (1907-1923)
José Guadalupe Ortíz y López (1923-1926), appointed Auxiliary Bishop of Monterrey, Nuevo León
Leopoldo Díaz y Escudero (1929-1955)
Alfonso Tóriz Cobián (1956-1958), appointed Bishop of Querétaro
Fidel Cortés Pérez (1958-1982)
José María Hernández González (1983-1989), appointed Bishop of Netzahualcóyotl
frén Ramos Salazar (1990-2005)
Alejo Zavala Castro (2005-2015)
Salvador Rangel Mendoza, O.F.M. (2015-2022)
José de Jesús González Hernández, O.F.M. (2022-present)

Coadjutor bishop
Alfonso Tóriz Cobián (1954-1956)

See also
Chilpancingo
Chilapa de Álvarez

External links and references

Chilpancingo-Chilapa
Chilpancingo-Chilapa, Roman Catholic Diocese of
Chilpancingo-Chilapa
Chilpancingo-Chilapa
1863 establishments in Mexico